The Deniliquin Football & Netball Club, nicknamed the Rams, is an Australian rules football and netball club based in the town of Deniliquin located in the Riverina district of New South Wales.

The club's teams currently compete in the Murray FNL, which the Deniliquin football club joined in 1949.

History 
Football appears to have been played in and around Deniliquin as early as the 1870s, but today's Deniliquin FC was born some six decades later, in 1933.

In early July, 1892, two football clubs were established in Deniliquin, one called the Imperials, of North Deniliquin and the South Deniliquin Football Club.

The first recorded match was in late July, 1892 between was between South Deniliquin: 2.6 – 18 defeating Imperials: 1.8 – 14.

In 1893, Deniliquin FC played a match against Echuca and was played on the Park Oval, with Echuca thrashing Deniliquin.

In 1894, the Deniliquin Juniors played a match against the Echuca Railway Juniors, on the Park Oval, Echuca.

In 1895, Deniliquin were runners up for the Gillespie Cup to the Trades FC.

In 1899, three football club's were formed in Deniliquin.

In 1900, the Deniliquin Football Association was established.

In 1901, the Deniliquin footballers, under the name of the Commonwealth Football Club won the premiership and received premiership medals from Mr. John Moore Chanter, MHR.

The Deniliquin Football Association ran from 1900 to 1932, with usually three clubs from within the town of Deniliquin playing in this competition on a regular basis up until 1932.

In 1933, the Deniliquin Football Club was formed and were admitted into the Echuca Football League, with Norm Sexton as coach.

In 1949, Deniliquin joined the Murray Football League.

Football Premierships
Seniors
 Echuca Football League (3):
 1933, 1934, 1935
 Murray Football League (14):
 1957, 1966, 1972, 1973, 1975, 1976, 1985, 1986, 1996, 2001, 2002, 2003, 2004, 2011

Reserves
Murray Valley Second Eighteen Football Association
 1954
Murray Football League
 1962, 1967, 1972, 1973, 1975, 1978, 1979, 1985, 1993, 1996, 2001,

VFL / AFL players
A small number of former Deniliquin players have gone on to play in the Victorian and Australian Football Leagues (VFL and AFL), including – 
1953 – Ian Egerton – Hawthorn
1953 – Bob Henderson – Fitzroy
1963 – Peter Lyon – Hawthorn
1982 – Simon O'Donnell – St. Kilda
1991 – Peter McIntyre – Adelaide Crows
1995 – Leo Barry – Sydney Swans
2014 – Sam Lloyd Richmond & Western Bulldogs
2017 – Todd Marshall – Port Adelaide

Additionally, former VFL footballers to have played / coached Deniliquin in the following year(s)include –

1933 – Norm Sexton – Carlton & Footscray
1947 – Phil Nagle – Richmond
1950 – Kevin O'Donnell – St. Kilda
1953 – Keith Schaefer – South Melbourne
1955 – Peter O'Donohue – Hawthorn
1966 – Graham Ion – Footscray

References

External links

 Gameday website
 
 Footypedia page

Murray Football League clubs
Deniliquin
1933 establishments in Australia
Australian rules football clubs in New South Wales
Sports clubs established in 1933
Australian rules football clubs established in 1933
Netball teams in New South Wales